Wan Jiyuan (born 13 July 2002) is a Chinese basketball player. She competed in the 2020 Summer Olympics.

References

2002 births
Living people
3x3 basketball players at the 2020 Summer Olympics
Chinese women's 3x3 basketball players
Chinese women's basketball players
Medalists at the 2020 Summer Olympics
Olympic 3x3 basketball players of China
Olympic bronze medalists for China
Olympic medalists in 3x3 basketball